Born in the U.S.A. is a 1984 album by Bruce Springsteen.

Born in the U.S.A. may also refer to:

"Born in the U.S.A." (song), the title track of the Springsteen album
Born in the U.S.A Tour, the tour supporting the release of the Springsteen album
Born in the USA (radio show), an Australian radio broadcast discussing American-based sports
Born in the U.S.A., an album by Finnish rapper Ruudolf
Born in the U.S.A., the original title of the Paul Schrader film Light of Day

See also
Birthright citizenship in the United States
Born in America, a 1983 album by Riot